James Brown Roberts (11 October 1933 — 15 April 2021) was a Scottish first-class cricketer.

Roberts was born at Dundee in October 1933. He was educated at the Royal High School, Edinburgh. Roberts initially played his club cricket for the East of Scotland, before moving to Clydesdale Cricket Club when he moved to Glasgow for his work in the finance industry. He made his debut for Scotland in first-class cricket against Yorkshire at Hull in 1956, with Roberts playing first-class cricket for Scotland on a further nine occasions to 1959. Playing primarily as a seam bowler, he took 13 wickets at an average of 33.38, with best figures of 3 for 70. As a lower order batsman, he scored 154 runs at an average 12.38, with a highest score of 31 not out. Roberts later had a spell as a national selector for the Scottish cricket team. He died at Strathaven in April 2021.

References

External links
 

1933 births
2021 deaths
Cricketers from Dundee
People educated at the Royal High School, Edinburgh
Scottish cricketers
Scotland national cricket team selectors